The 1948–49 William & Mary Indians men's basketball team represented the College of William & Mary in intercollegiate basketball during the 1948–49 NCAA men's basketball season. Under the second year of head coach Barney Wilson, the team finished the season 24–10 and 10–3 in the Southern Conference, the most wins in program history. This was the 44th season of the collegiate basketball program at William & Mary, whose nickname is now the Tribe. William & Mary played its home games at Blow Gymnasium.

The Indians finished in 2nd place in the conference and qualified for the 1949 Southern Conference men's basketball tournament, hosted by Duke University at the Duke Indoor Stadium in Durham, North Carolina, where the Indians defeated Davidson in the quarterfinals before losing  a triple overtime game against George Washington in the semifinals.

However, William & Mary was invited to participate in the 1949 Cincinnati Invitational Tournament, where the Indians lost against both Xavier and La Salle.

Program notes
With 24 wins, 1948–49 remains William & Mary's winningest season in program history. The next best seasons for the Indians/Tribe came in 1949–50 (23 wins) and 2009–10 (22 wins). 
This was the first 20 win season in program history. The Indians would record 20 wins again during both subsequent seasons under head coach Barney Wilson. Wilson would go on to record the highest career winning percentage of any William & Mary men's basketball coach.
The Indians played six teams for the first time this season: Milligan, Albright, Rider, Towson, Baltimore, and La Salle. 
The Indians played their first ever game against a ranked opponent when they lost to #17 NC State on February 5, 1949.
William & Mary's triple overtime loss to George Washington in the Southern Conference tournament remains tied with 6 other games (from 1958, 1961, 1981, 2008, and 2009) for the longest game in school history.
William & Mary's appearance in the Cincinnati Invitational Tournament was the program's first ever postseason tournament bid.

Schedule

|-
!colspan=9 style="background:#006400; color:#FFD700;"| Regular season

|-
!colspan=9 style="background:#006400; color:#FFD700;"| 1949 Southern Conference Tournament

|-
!colspan=9 style="background:#006400; color:#FFD700;"| 1949 Cincinnati Invitational Tournament

Source

References

William & Mary Tribe men's basketball seasons
William and Mary Indians
William and Mary Indians Men's Basketball Team
William and Mary Indians Men's Basketball Team